Alexander Shafranovich (born ) is an Israeli volleyball player who currently plays for Hapoel Mate-Asher Ako. He was member of the Israel men's national volleyball team for 20 years. He was one of the key players that contributed to 2 Greek Championships and 3 Cups for PAOK.

Sporting achievements
 2004–2005  German Championship, with VfB Friedrichshafen
 2004–2005  German Cup, with VfB Friedrichshafen
 2007–2008  French Cup, with Beauvais Oise UC
 2010–2011  Montenegrin Championship, with OK Budvanska Rivijera
 2010–2011  Montenegrin Cup, with OK Budvanska Rivijera
 2012–2013  German Cup, with TSV Unterhaching
 2014–2015  Greek Championship, with PAOK
 2014–2015  Greek Cup, with PAOK
 2016–2017  Greek Championship, with PAOK
 2017–2018  Greek Cup, with PAOK
 2018–2019  Greek Cup, with PAOK

Individual
 2016–2017 Greek Championship MVP

References

External links
 Alexander Shafranovich Clubs
 

1984 births
Living people
Israeli men's volleyball players
People from Pryluky
Israeli people of Ukrainian-Jewish descent